The 14th Empire Awards ceremony (officially known as the Jameson Empire Awards), presented by the British film magazine Empire, honored the best films of 2008 and took place on 29 March 2009 at the Grosvenor House Hotel in London, England. During the ceremony, Empire presented Empire Awards in 12 categories as well as four honorary awards. To celebrate the 20th anniversary of Empire magazine a special honorary award was presented, the Actor of our Lifetime and to mark the loss of Heath Ledger, he was awarded the special honorary Heath Ledger Tribute Award. The Sony Ericsson Soundtrack Award was renamed to "Best Soundtrack" and the Best Sci-Fi/Fantasy award was renamed this year only to "Best Sci-Fi/Superhero". The Best Newcomer and Best Soundtrack awards were presented for the last time. Irish comedian Dara Ó Briain hosted the show for the first time. The awards were sponsored by Jameson Irish Whiskey for the first time.

The Dark Knight won the most awards with three including Best Film and Best Director for Christopher Nolan. Other winners included Eden Lake, Mamma Mia!, Quantum of Solace, RocknRolla, Son of Rambow, Sweeney Todd: The Demon Barber of Fleet Street and Wanted with one. Viggo Mortensen received the Empire Icon Award, Danny Boyle received the Outstanding Contribution to British Film award, Russell Crowe received the Actor of our Lifetime award and Heath Ledger received a special post-mortem tribute. Stephen Power and Conal O'Meara from the United Kingdom won the Done In 60 Seconds Award for their 60-second film version of Jerry Maguire.

Winners and nominees
Winners are listed first and highlighted in boldface. The shortlisted nominees were revealed on 2 March 2009 and finale voting ended on 12 March  2009.

Multiple awards
The following film received multiple awards:

Multiple nominations
The following 12 films received multiple nominations:

Done In 60 Seconds films

Notes

References

External links
 
 

Empire Award ceremonies
2008 film awards
2009 in London
2009 in British cinema
March 2009 events in the United Kingdom
2000s in the City of Westminster